Senator Padilla may refer to:

Alejandro García Padilla (born 1971), Senate of Puerto Rico
Alex Padilla (born 1973), U.S. Senator for California
Michael Padilla (born 1972), New Mexico State Senate
Migdalia Padilla (fl. 2000s–2010s), Senate of Puerto Rico
Víctor Marrero Padilla, Senate of Puerto Rico